American Srbobran is a bilingual Serbian and English language newspaper which has been published in Pittsburgh since 1906. The American Srbobran is the oldest Serbian-language newspaper currently in publication in the United States. The newspaper had a daily circulation of 10,000 in 1922. During World War II, the newspaper had a Serbian nationalist stance.

References

Serbian-language newspapers published in the United States
1906 establishments in Pennsylvania